Maamannan is an upcoming Indian Tamil-language political thriller film written and directed by Mari Selvaraj and produced by Udhayanidhi Stalin. The film stars Udhayanidhi Stalin, Fahadh Faasil, Keerthy Suresh, and Vadivelu. Principal photography began in March 2022.

Cast 
 Vadivelu
 Fahadh Faasil
 Keerthy Suresh
 Udhayanidhi Stalin
 Raveena Ravi

Music 
The music is composed by A. R. Rahman, in his first collaboration with Mari Selvaraj.

Release

Theatrical 
The makers then announced that the film is tentatively planned to be released on April 2023.

Home media 
The post theatrical streaming rights of the film has been bagged by Netflix.

References

External links

Upcoming Tamil-language films